The 2021 Folds of Honor QuikTrip 500 was a NASCAR Cup Series race held on March 21, 2021, at Atlanta Motor Speedway in Hampton, Georgia. Contested over 325 laps on the 1.54-mile-long (2.48 km) asphalt quad-oval intermediate speedway, it was the sixth race of the 2021 NASCAR Cup Series season.

Report

Background

Atlanta Motor Speedway (formerly Atlanta International Raceway) is a track in Hampton, Georgia, 20 miles (32 km) south of Atlanta. It is a  quad-oval track with a seating capacity of 111,000. It opened in 1960 as a  standard oval. In 1994, 46 condominiums were built over the northeastern side of the track. In 1997, to standardize the track with Speedway Motorsports' other two  ovals, the entire track was almost completely rebuilt. The frontstretch and backstretch were swapped, and the configuration of the track was changed from oval to quad-oval. The project made the track one of the fastest on the NASCAR circuit.

Entry list
 (R) denotes rookie driver.
 (i) denotes driver who are ineligible for series driver points.

Qualifying
Denny Hamlin was awarded the pole for the race as determined by competition-based formula.

Starting Lineup

Race
Ryan Blaney won the race, driving a Ford. Kyle Larson led for 269 laps, but Blaney overtook him eight laps from the end because Larson's tires were wearing out.

Stage Results

Stage One
Laps: 105

Stage Two
Laps: 105

Final Stage Results

Stage Three
Laps: 115

Race statistics
 Lead changes: 11 among 6 different drivers
 Cautions/Laps: 5 for 25
 Red flags: 0
 Time of race: 3 hours, 27 minutes and 41 seconds
 Average speed:

Media

Television
The Folds of Honor QuikTrip 500 was carried by Fox in the United States. Mike Joy, five-time Atlanta winner Jeff Gordon and Clint Bowyer called the race from the broadcast booth. Jamie Little and Regan Smith handled pit road for the television side. Larry McReynolds provided insight from the Fox Sports studio in Charlotte.

Radio
The race was broadcast on radio by the Performance Racing Network and simulcast on Sirius XM NASCAR Radio. Doug Rice and Mark Garrow called the race from the booth when the field raced down the front stretch. Rob Albright called the race from atop a billboard outside of turn 2 when the field raced through turns 1 and 2 & Pat Patterson called the race from a billboard outside of turn 3 when the field raced through turns 3 and 4. On pit road, PRN was manned by Brad Gillie, Doug Turnbull and Wendy Venturini.

Standings after the race

Drivers' Championship standings

Manufacturers' Championship standings

Note: Only the first 16 positions are included for the driver standings.

References

2021 in sports in Georgia (U.S. state)
2021 NASCAR Cup Series
Folds of Honor QuikTrip 500
NASCAR races at Atlanta Motor Speedway